Apollo Bay is a rural locality on Bruny Island, in the local government area (LGA) of Kingborough in the Hobart LGA region of Tasmania. The 2021 census recorded a population of 38 for Apollo Bay.

History 
Apollo Bay is a confirmed locality. Anecdotal evidence suggests that Apollo Bay was named after the brig ‘Apollo’ (105 tons) built in 1826 for Captain J Laughton and which was sadly wrecked in 1827 at the north end of Maria Island.

Geography
The D'Entrecasteaux Channel forms the western boundary, and most of the northern and southern boundaries. Apollo Bay also have a beach located along Apollo Bay Rd, shortly after the turn off to Mulcahys Road. Apollo Bay has two major zones Environmental Living and Rural Resource where existing natural and landscape values are to be retained. It is characterised by native vegetation cover.

Road infrastructure 
Route B66 (Lennon Road) passes to the north-east. Access is provided by Apollo Bay Road. Apollo Bay is located approximately 4.5 km from the ferry terminal on Bruny Island making it a short 7 min drive.

Tourism 
Apollo Bay is part of Bruny Island but situated along a no-through road meaning tourists rarely explore the locality. Whilst the permanent population in Apollo Bay is small, there are many houses and blocks of land dotted across the area making it a popular holiday destination for locals visiting their "shacks". 

Apollo Bay is a close drive to Bruny Island's growing food, wine and tourism businesses including Bruny Island Cheese Company, Bruny Island oyster farm, vineyards, smokehouse, the oldest continuous lighthouse (Cape Bruny lighthouse) and breathtaking beaches. The island offers a wide range of tourist adventures which attract local, national and international visitors.

Accommodation 
Accommodation in Apollo Bay is limited. "The Apollo Bay House" by Dock 4 Architects was completed in 2018 and can be rented by visitors. Apollo's Rest is another stunning property that can be rented on Airbnb via Bruny Island Management. Increasingly popular is also the opportunity to explore Bruny Island using a hired campervan, via bike or in a car with a tent. For these people, Apollo Bay do offer private camping through HipCampers and one such available site is "Quoll Hideaway - Bruny Bush and Beach" which sits on land inhabited by the famous eastern quoll (Dasyurus viverrinus) which is thought to be extinct on the Australian mainland.

References

Towns in Tasmania
Localities of Kingborough Council